An Investment advisory, in financial/investment organizations, is the unit linking the investment professionals in the central asset management unit (Investment Research, Portfolio Management) to the relationship managers and/or to important clients of the asset management organization.

Investment Advisors explain the investment ideas of the experts to their internal or external clientele and propose adequate investment solutions. In turn, they identify needs and wishes of the clients or the Relationship Managers of their organization and transport them to the central (financial/investment) asset management unit. Investment advisers basically provide you recommendations and advice related to your portfolio or investment in different fields like mutual funds, intraday trading, investment in share market, tax-saving policies. 
In INDIA.,investment advisors are registered with SEBI {Securities Exchange Board Of India}. If any person wants to be an Investment advisor then he/she will have to go through the registration process of SEBI, then only he/she can provide advice in INDIA.
In the U.S., investment advisors are registered with the SEC.

Stock market advisory and research services are highly regulated in India. Only SEBI registered stock advisory and investment research analysts are allowed to do so. The complete details of these authorized persons are available on website of SEBI for protection of investors. Unfortunately, the stock market is full of unscrupulous and fly by night operators and as a long-term investor it is advisable that one doesn’t fall a prey to such elements.

References

Investment